Nakia D. Johnson is an American author who specializes in African-American literature. She is the author of the novel Uptempo (2009).  An alum of Cardinal Spellman High School and Manhattan College, where she earned a Bachelor of Science in management, Johnson resides in New York City.

External links
 Official website
 Our Writes of Passage website
 Nakia D. Johnson on Facebook
 Uptempo on Google Books

Living people
African-American novelists
American women novelists
Writers from the Bronx
21st-century American writers
Year of birth missing (living people)
Manhattan College alumni
21st-century American women writers
Novelists from New York (state)
Cardinal Spellman High School (New York City) alumni
21st-century African-American women writers
21st-century African-American writers